Events from the year 1959 in Romania. During the year, the country hosted the first International Mathematical Olympiad.

Incumbents
President of the Provisional Presidium of the Republic: Ion Gheorghe Maurer.
Prime Minister: Chivu Stoica.
General Secretary of the Romanian Communist Party: Gheorghe Gheorghiu-Dej.

Events
 31 January – Sandu Tudor begins a 40-year sentence at Jilava Prison for "conspiracy against the social order" and "intense activity against the working class".
 29 May – Sociologists form a National Sociological Committee, which soon joins the International Sociological Association, to encourage the development of the discipline.
 July – Babeș-Bolyai University is formed in Cluj by the merger of Babeș and Bolyai Universities, which had as their languages of instruction Romanian and Hungarian respectively.
 23 July – Brașov and Bucharest jointly host the first International Mathematical Olympiad, which runs until 31 July.
 28 July – The Ioanid Gang allegedly steal 1.6 million lei from a National Bank of Romania armored car.
 28 October – The Grand National Assembly adopts Decree No 410 which abolishes many monasteries, including Radu Vodă Monastery.

Art and literature
  (The Daring), a novel by Marin Preda, is published.

Cinema and theatre
 Eugène Ionesco writes the play Rhinoceros.
 Mingea (The Ball), directed by Andrei Blaier and Sinișa Ivetici, is released. It is shown at the 1st Moscow International Film Festival.

Births
 26 January – Mircea Fulger, boxer, bronze medal winner at the 1984 Summer Olympics.
 4 February – Monica Macovei, politician and Minister of Justice between 2004 and 2007.
 20 March – Felicia Filip, operatic soprano.
 5 April – Florica Prevenda, artist.
 28 April – Lucia Romanov-Stark, tennis player.
 13 June – Klaus Iohannis, President of Romania from 2014.
 14 June – Alexandru Darie, theater director (died 2019).
 17 September – Florentin Crihălmeanu, Romanian Greek Catholic bishop of Cluj-Gherla (died 2021).
 21 September – Crin Antonescu, politician, served as Acting President of Romania and President of the Senate.
 6 November – Marin Gheorghe, rower, silver medal winner at the 1992 Summer Olympics.

Deaths
 30 January – Elena Săcălici, gymnast, member of the team that won the first Olympic and world team bronze medal for Romania, at the 1956 Summer Olympics (born 1935).
 11 February – Ioan Bălan, Bishop of the Romanian Greek Catholic Church (born 1880).
 13 May – Emil Hațieganu, politician and jurist (born 1878). 
 24 July – Mihail Lascăr, general during World War II and Minister of Defense from 1946 to 1947 (born 1889).
 24 November – Ion Gigurtu, far-right politician, officer, engineer, and industrialist who served as Prime Minister from 4 July to 4 September 1940, died at Râmnicu Sărat Prison (born 1886).
 29 December – Gheorghe N. Leon, economist and politician, died at Râmnicu Sărat Prison (born 1888).

References

Years of the 20th century in Romania
1950s in Romania
1959 in Romania
Romania
Romania